is a 2016 Japanese kaiju film directed by Hideaki Anno and Shinji Higuchi, with a screenplay by Anno and visual effects by Higuchi. Produced by Toho Pictures and Cine Bazar and distributed by Toho Co., Ltd., it is the 31st film in the Godzilla franchise, the 29th film produced by Toho, Toho's third reboot of the franchise, and the first film in the franchise's Reiwa era. It is the first reboot of a tokusatsu series to be adapted by Anno and Higuchi, followed by Shin Ultraman and Shin Kamen Rider. The film stars Hiroki Hasegawa, Yutaka Takenouchi, and Satomi Ishihara. In the film, politicians struggle with bureaucratic red tape in order to deal with the sudden appearance of a giant monster that evolves whenever it is attacked.

In December 2014, Toho announced plans for a new domestic Godzilla film. Anno and Higuchi were announced as the directors in March 2015. Principal photography began in September 2015 and ended in October 2015. Inspiration for the film was drawn from the Fukushima Daiichi nuclear disaster and the 2011 Tōhoku earthquake and tsunami.

Shin Godzilla was theatrically released on July 29, 2016, to acclaim from Japanese critics and mixed reviews from Western critics. The film grossed  worldwide and was the highest-grossing live-action Japanese film of 2016 and became the highest-grossing Japanese-produced Godzilla film in the franchise. It received 11 Japan Academy Prize nominations and won seven, including Picture of the Year and Director of the Year.

Plot

When the Japan Coast Guard investigates an abandoned yacht in Tokyo Bay, their boat is destroyed and the Tokyo Bay Aqua-Line is flooded. After seeing a viral video of the incident, Deputy Chief Cabinet Secretary Rando Yaguchi believes it was caused by a living creature, which is confirmed as news reports reveal its tail emerging from the ocean. Shortly thereafter, the creature moves in land, crawling through the Kamata district of Tokyo, leaving a path of death and destruction during an inadequate evacuation. The creature quickly evolves into a bipedal form, but overheats and returns to the sea.

The government officials focus on military strategy and civilian safety; Yaguchi is put in charge of a task force researching the creature. With high radiation readings from the creature's path, they realize that it is energized by nuclear fission. The U.S. sends a special envoy, Kayoco Anne Patterson, who reveals that Goro Maki, a disgraced, anti-nuclear zoology professor, studied mutations caused by radioactive contamination, predicting the appearance of the creature. Maki was disbelieved by both American and Japanese scientific circles. The U.S. then prevented him from making his conclusions public. The abandoned yacht in Tokyo Bay was Maki's, who left his research notes, jumbled into a code, on the boat before disappearing.

The creature - named "Godzilla" after Maki's research - reappears in its fourth-form, twice its original size, making landfall near Kamakura. The Japan Self-Defense Forces mobilize, but prove ineffective as Godzilla breaks through their defenses into Tokyo. The U.S. intervenes with a massively-destructive air strike plan, prompting the evacuation of civilians and government personnel. Godzilla is wounded with MOP "bunker-buster" bombs, but responds with destructive atomic rays fired from its mouth and dorsal plates, destroying the helicopter carrying the prime minister along with top government officials and incinerating large swaths of Tokyo. Depleting its energy, Godzilla enters a dormant state and becomes immobile.

Yaguchi's team discovers that Godzilla's plates and blood work as a cooling system, theorizing that they could use a coagulating agent to freeze it. Analyzing tissue samples, it’s discovered Godzilla is an ever-evolving creature, able to reproduce asexually. The United Nations, aware of this, informs Japan that thermonuclear weapons will be used against Godzilla should the Japanese fail to subdue it in a few days; evacuations are ordered in multiple prefectures in preparation. Unwilling to see nuclear weapons detonated in Japan again, Patterson uses her political connections to buy time for Yaguchi's team, in whom the interim government has little faith.

Yaguchi's team manages to decipher Goro Maki's encoded research using origami. They adjust their plan and procure the means to conduct their deep freeze plan with international support. Hours before the planned nuclear attack, Japan enacts the deep freeze plan. Godzilla is provoked into expending its atomic breath and energy against drones. The team then detonates nearby buildings and send trains towards Godzilla's feet, subduing it, and allowing tankers full of coagulant to inject it into Godzilla's mouth. Many are killed, but Godzilla is frozen solid.

In the aftermath, the Godzilla fallout is discovered to have a very short half-life and that Tokyo can soon be reconstructed. The international community agrees to cancel the nuclear attack on condition that, in the event of Godzilla's reawakening, an immediate thermonuclear strike will be executed. On Godzilla's tail, humanoid creatures appear frozen in the process of emerging.

Cast
Hiroki Hasegawa as Rando Yaguchi, Deputy Chief Cabinet Secretary. After Toho offered him the role, Hasegawa immediately accepted, stating, "Who wouldn't want to be involved in a Godzilla production?".
Yutaka Takenouchi as Hideki Akasaka, Aide to Prime Minister. Takenouchi stated that the film would contain a "deeper message".
Satomi Ishihara as Kayoco Anne Patterson, Special Envoy for the President of the United States. She became excited after accepting the role but stressed that her character features "English-heavy dialogue", stating, "Sometimes it's so frustrating, I just want to cry".

The film features several cameos and supporting appearances, including Kengo Kora, Ren Osugi, Akira Emoto, Kimiko Yo, Jun Kunimura, Mikako Ichikawa, Pierre Taki, Takumi Saito, Keisuke Koide, Arata Furuta, Sei Hiraizumi, Kenichi Yajima, Tetsu Watanabe, Ken Mitsuishi, Kyūsaku Shimada, Kanji Tsuda, Issei Takahashi, Shinya Tsukamoto, Kazuo Hara, Isshin Inudo, Akira Ogata, Shingo Tsurumi, Suzuki Matsuo, Kreva, Katsuhiko Yokomitsu, and Atsuko Maeda. Mansai Nomura portrayed Godzilla through motion capture. Jun Kunimura previously appeared in Godzilla: Final Wars. Akira Emoto appeared in Godzilla vs. SpaceGodzilla.

Cast taken from the press notes, except where cited otherwise.

Themes
Whereas the original Godzilla was conceived as a metaphor for the atomic bombings of Hiroshima and Nagasaki, Shin Godzilla drew inspiration from the Fukushima Daiichi nuclear disaster and the 2011 Tōhoku earthquake and tsunami. Many critics noted similarities to those events. Mark Schilling of The Japan Times wrote that the Godzilla creature serves "as an ambulatory tsunami, earthquake and nuclear reactor, leaving radioactive contamination in his wake". Roland Kelts, the author of Japanamerica, felt that the "mobilizing blue-suited civil servants and piles of broken planks and debris quite nakedly echo scenes of the aftermath of the great Tohoku earthquake, tsunami and nuclear disaster." Matt Alt of The New Yorker drew similar parallels with "the sight of blue-jumpsuited government spokesmen convening emergency press conferences ... [and] a stunned man quietly regarding mountains of debris, something that could have been lifted straight out of television footage of the hardest-hit regions up north. Even the sight of the radioactive monster's massive tail swishing over residential streets evokes memories of the fallout sent wafting over towns and cities in the course of Fukushima Daiichi's meltdown."

Robert Rath from Zam argued that Shin Godzilla is a satire of Japanese politics, and likened the protagonist Rando Yaguchi to the Fukushima plant manager Masao Yoshida. William Tsutsui, author of Godzilla on My Mind, wrote in the Arkansas Democrat-Gazette that "Shin Godzilla leaves no doubt that the greatest threat to Japan comes not from without but from within, from a geriatric, fossilized government bureaucracy unable to act decisively or to stand up resolutely to foreign pressure." In his review for Forbes, Ollie Barder wrote that the film depicted the Japanese government's "complex and corpulent bureaucratic ways ... unable to deal with a crisis in any kind of efficient or fluid way", noting that the government members use the hierarchical system to protect their positions at the expense of citizens' lives. According to Schilling, the government officials, Self-Defense Forces officers and others working to defeat Godzilla are portrayed as hardworking and intelligent, despite "some initial bumbling".

Former prime minister Shinzō Abe spoke positively of the film's pro-nationalist themes, stating, "I think that [Godzilla's] popularity is rooted in the unwavering support that the public has for the Self-Defense Forces."

Production

Crew

Hideaki Anno – director, writer, editor
Shinji Higuchi – co-director, VFX director
Katsuro Onoe – associate director, VFX creative director
Kimiyoshi Adachi – assistant director
Akihiro Yamauchi – executive producer
Takeshi Sato – production manager
Masato Inatsuki – production manager
Kensei Mori – line producer
Atsuki Satō – editor, VFX supervisor
Tetsuo Ohya – VFX producer

Personnel taken from the press notes.

Development

In December 2014, Toho announced plans for a new Godzilla film for a 2016 release, stating, "This is very good timing after the success of the American version this year: if not now, then when? The licensing contract we have with Legendary places no restrictions on us making domestic versions." The new film would have no ties to Legendary's MonsterVerse and would serve as a reboot to Toho's series. Minami Ichikawa would serve as the film's production manager and Taiji Ueda as the film's project leader. Ueda confirmed that the screenplay was in development and filming had been planned for a summer 2015 shoot. Toho would additionally put together a project team, known as "Godzilla Conference" or "Godzi-con", to formulate future projects.

In March 2015, Toho announced that the film would be co-directed by Hideaki Anno and Shinji Higuchi (who both collaborated on the anime Neon Genesis Evangelion), in addition to Anno writing the screenplay and Higuchi directing the film's special effects. In addition, Toho announced that the film will begin filming in the fall of 2015 set for a summer 2016 release. Promotional artwork of the new Godzilla's footprint was also released, with Toho confirming that their new Godzilla will surpass Legendary Pictures' Godzilla as the tallest incarnation to date.

Toho had approached Anno in January 2013 to direct the reboot but Anno initially declined due to falling into another depression after completing Evangelion: 3.0 You Can (Not) Redo, stating, "A representative from Toho contacted me directly, saying, 'We'd like to direct a new Godzilla film.' At the time, I was still recovering from EVA 3.0, and right on the spot, flatly refused the offer, 'It's impossible. Even to begin work on the next Eva is impossible.'" However, Toho's sincerity and his longtime friend and co-director, Shinji Higuchi, eventually convinced him to accept the offer in March 2013. Anno had also refused the offer due to a lack of confidence, stating, "I refused [the offer] since I didn't have confidence that I could exceed the first film or come close to equaling it. But I thought that if I were to come close even a little, I would have to do the same thing [as the first film]." Mahiro Maeda provided the new design for Godzilla while Takayuki Takeya provided the maquette. Director Higuchi stated that he intended to provide the "most terrifying Godzilla that Japan's cutting-edge special-effects movie-making can muster." A variety of techniques such as puppets, animatronics, and digital effects were initially considered and an upper-body animatronic was produced but went unused after Toho decided to create a completely CG Godzilla. VFX supervisor and co-editor Atsuki Satō stated, "CG production had already been determined when I began participating. In the end, it was the best option to allow quick edits as creative visions changed and produced a high quality film." A colorless maquette was built for CG animators to use as a reference when rendering the CG Godzilla model. Mansai Nomura provided the motion capture performance for Godzilla.

Filming
Principal photography began on September 1, 2015, with a large on-location film shoot at Kamata station in Tokyo under the working title "Shin Gojira". On September 23, 2015, Toho revealed the film's official title as Shin Gojira and that the film will star Hiroki Hasegawa, Yutaka Takenouchi, and Satomi Ishihara. Producer Akihiro Yamauchi stated that the title Shin Gojira was chosen for the film due to the variety of meanings it conveys, such as either "new" (新), "true" (真), or "God" (神). Yamauchi also confirmed that the film has been planned for quite some time, stating, "It's been in the works a long time. It's not like it was produced just because of the Hollywood Godzilla". Principal photography wrapped at the end of October 2015, with special effects work scheduled for November 2015.

Music
Shiro Sagisu scored the film. The score features various remixes of "Decisive Battle" from Sagisu's Neon Genesis Evangelion score and recycles several Akira Ifukube tracks. Anno had decided to use Ifukube's music while writing the screenplay and attempted to adapt the old Ifukube tracks to modern stereo settings but the task proved too daunting and eventually settled on using the mono mixes instead. The soundtrack was released on July 30, 2016, and sold 8,427 copies in 2 weeks.

Release

Marketing

In November 2015, without any prior announcement, Toho screened a promo reel at the American Film Market for a potential sale for overseas markets, marketing the film (for a while) as Godzilla: Resurgence. In December 2015, Toho unveiled the film's first teaser trailer and teaser poster revealing Toho's new Godzilla design and the film's July 29, 2016, release date. Shin is the second tallest live action Godzilla in history.

In January 2016, images of the Godzilla suit were leaked online. In late March 2016, it was announced that Toho's Godzilla and Anno's Evangelion intellectual properties will form a "maximum collaboration" for merchandise in April 2016. In mid-April 2016, Toho revealed the complete design of the new Godzilla and that it is a completely CG-generated character, as well as a new trailer, details regarding the principal and supporting characters, and that the film will be released in IMAX, 4DX, and MX4D formats for its domestic release.

For summer 2016, the Namja Town amusement park held special Godzilla cross-promotion activities. The park unveiled a new virtual reality game, the food court produced kaiju-inspired food dishes,  and a Godzilla foot on display as though it had crashed through the roof of the attached Sunshine City Alpa shopping center. Sports equipment manufacturer Reebok released limited-edition Godzilla sneakers featuring a black reptilian skin pattern and either red or glow-in-the-dark green coloring in Japan.

Theatrical

Shin Godzilla was theatrically released on July 29, 2016 in Japan in IMAX, 4DX, and MX4D in over 350 theaters and 446 screens. It had its red carpet premiere on July 25, 2016. The premiere took place in Tokyo along Kabuki-cho Central Road, with a red carpet from the Hotel Gracery Shinjuku, the hotel which has the large Godzilla head peering over, 118.5 metres in length, the same distance as the height of Godzilla.

In April 2016, New World Cinemas was named one of the distributors to release the film in the United States, later confirming via their official Facebook that they were "working hard to bring Godzilla to every state." However, in June 2016, New World Cinemas clarified on their official Facebook that "New World Cinemas are not the distributers  for the new Godzilla Film. The mistake was make  because we said Godzilla coming soon. This was merely a post to promote Godzilla as we too are big fans. We apologise for any confusion regarding this film."

In July 2016, Toho announced that the film had been sold to 100 territories (including Asia, Africa, Europe, and North America) in 19 days after opening to foreign sales and will be released in Taiwan on August 12, the Philippines on August 24, Hong Kong and Macao on August 25, and Thailand on September 8. At the 2016 San Diego Comic-Con, it was announced that Funimation would distribute the film for North America, Central America, South America, and the Caribbean for a late 2016 release as Shin Godzilla, instead of Godzilla: Resurgence, at the insistence of Toho.

In early September, Funimation officially announced that the film was to be given a one-week limited release in the United States and Canada from October 11–18 on 440 screens, in Japanese with English subtitles, making it the first Japanese Godzilla film to receive a theatrical North American release since Godzilla 2000. Funimation hosted two North American premieres for the film, one premiere on October 3 in Los Angeles and the other on October 5 in New York. Due to popular demand, Funimation extended the film's North American theatrical run with encore screenings for October 22 and select theaters offering daily screenings through October 27. In the same month, Indonesian Film Censorship Board listed and registered both Shin Godzilla and Doraemon: Nobita and the Birth of Japan 2016.

In the UK, Altitude Films screened the film at FrightFest in Glasgow on February 24, 2017. Altitude Films later dropped the film, with The Electric confirming in a Tweet: "the UK distributor Altitude have dropped it, and Toho aren't allowing any UK screenings at the mo ." The UK theatrical rights were later acquired by Manga Entertainment for an August 10, 2017 release.

Home media
In Japan, Shin Godzilla was released on DVD and Blu-ray by Toho on March 22, 2017. The film's Japan home video release sold 520,000 units for the DVD version, 100,000 units for the Blu-ray Special Edition, and 55,402 units for the Blu-ray Standard Edition, totaling 675,402 DVD and Blu-ray sales in Japan. In North America, the film was released on Blu-ray, DVD and digital on August 1, 2017 by Funimation, which featured an English dub produced by Funimation. In the United States, the Blu-ray and DVD grossed $4.5 million in video sales. In the United Kingdom, the film was released on DVD and Blu-ray by Manga Entertainment on December 4, 2017. This release also included the Funimation dub. The film was released on DVD and Blu-Ray in the UK on December 4. The Blu-Ray edition of the film ranked at no.32 on the UK Blu-Ray chart for the week ending December 16.

Reception

Box office
In Japan Shin Godzilla earned  on its opening weekend and was number one at the box office for that weekend, placing Finding Dory at second place and One Piece Film: Gold at third place, and earned 23% more than 2014's Godzilla when it opened in Japan. It was more than triple the first weekend's gross of 2004's Godzilla: Final Wars, the previous Toho film in the series, which in the end grossed . The film remained at number one during its second weekend and was projected to finish at  domestically. The film dropped to second place during its third weekend, topped by The Secret Life of Pets, earning  after 17 days, topping the estimates for both 2004's Godzilla: Final Wars and 2014's Godzilla. The film reached   a month after its release, topping the earnings for Anno's previous film Evangelion: 3.0 You Can (Not) Redo, which earned .

On September 4, 2016, the film has grossed . Shin Godzilla became the highest grossing live-action Japanese film for 2016, and the second highest grossing film in Japan for the year. In the United States and Canada, the film grossed  during its limited 31 day run. Outside of Japan and North America, the film was released in a handful of International markets. In Taiwan, it grossed ; in Australia it grossed ; in New Zealand it grossed ; in Thailand it grossed ; in South Korea it grossed ; and in Spain it grossed . The film grossed  in Japan and  worldwide.

Critical response
Shin Godzilla received critical acclaim in Japan, while Western critics gave it a more mixed response. The special effects and new depiction of Godzilla were praised, but the film was criticized for its long scenes, confusing dialogue, over-crowded characters and subplots. On Rotten Tomatoes, the film has an approval rating of 86% based on 73 reviews, with an average rating of 6.70/10. The site's consensus reads: "Godzilla: Resurgence offers a refreshingly low-fi – and altogether entertaining – return to the monster's classic creature-feature roots." On Metacritic, the film has a score of 67 out of 100 based on 14 critics, indicating "generally favorable reviews."

Japanese pop culture site RO65 called the film a "masterpiece of unprecedented filmmaking", and felt that the film retains a "strong respect for the fundamental message within Godzilla". Oricon Style praised directors Hideaki Anno and Shinji Higuchi for their realistic approach and the film's reality vs. idealism themes, calling it a "world class" Godzilla film. Cinema Today called the film a "thrilling experience" and a "masterpiece", feeling that the film was a return to form similar to 2004's Dawn of the Dead. Kazuo Ozaki from Eiga.com praised the film as well, stating, "Hollywood, even with all its money, can't approach this kind of perfection" while Koichi Irikura of Cinema Today called it a "birth of a masterpiece that boldly announces the revival of a Japanese Godzilla". Brian Ashcraft from Kotaku felt the film was a "letdown", though he praised the film's special effects and social reflection of Japan, he criticized the film's depiction of the human characters, stating, "I wish the movie explored the relationships between the politicians and the researchers more instead of glossing over it" and concluded that "This isn't one of the best Godzilla films ever made, but it's certainly not one of the worst by any stretch, either. Godzilla: Resurgence is a series of compelling ideas in a so-so Godzilla movie".

Ollie Barder from Forbes was surprised at "how good" the film was, praising Anno's classic Gainax motifs, though he was not completely fond of Godzilla's new design; he felt that the "googly" eyes made Godzilla look silly but that the design was more "organic and menacing" than previous incarnations and praised the film's depiction of Godzilla, stating, "I really liked the way Godzilla is handled in this new movie, as it feels a lot more like the God Soldier short that both Anno and Higuchi worked on" and concluded by stating that he "really enjoyed" the film and that it had a "far more coherent plot" than 2014's Godzilla. Marcus Goh from Yahoo felt that the film was a better reimagining than 2014's Godzilla, though he criticized parts of Godzilla's design and the protagonists' plan to stop Godzilla. Goh gave the film a 3.1 score out of 5 and concluded that it "preserves the feel of Godzilla movies while updating it with modern responses". Jay Hawkinson from Bloody Disgusting called the film a "very good Godzilla movie that teeters on greatness". However, he felt the film's drama "didn't always work" and that some of the English delivery felt "canned and often corny", particularly from Ishihara's character. Hawkinson praised the film's battle-scenes, Shiro Sagisu's score, and the film's homages to the franchise, and concluded that "Shin Godzilla may be a reboot sans the rubber suit we've grown to love but it's unquestionably Godzilla". Guardian chief film critic Peter Bradshaw found Ishihara "slightly absurd" as an American "who bafflingly speaks English only with a strong and borderline unintelligible accent and comports herself with torpid model languor at all times".

Elizabeth Kerr from The Hollywood Reporter felt that Anno and Higuchi had done "the big guy justice" and "created a Godzilla for this era". While she felt that "all the telling (or reading) rather than showing reduces the story's overall impact" Kerr concluded that "there's an intangible quality to this Godzilla that Edwards (Emmerich doesn’t count) never quite captured, and which is always welcome". Matt Schley from Otaku USA called the film "A match made in kaiju-heaven", and praised Anno's directing: "It's also a reminder, after years in the Evangelion reboot woods, that Anno is one of Japan's most unique directorial voices in either animation or live-action filmmaking." Though he felt the special effects weren't as impressive as 2014's Godzilla, Schley stated that the film's CG "gets the job done, though there are a couple questionable shots" and concluded by stating that "Hideaki Anno has achieved a successful resurgence for both the Big G and himself".

Accolades

Post–release

Further films
In July 2017, Higuchi attended G-Fest XXIV and said that Toho could not make another Godzilla film until after 2020. This was due to Toho's contract with Legendary Entertainment, which restricts Toho from releasing a live-action Godzilla film in the same year as Legendary's Godzilla films; Legendary released Godzilla: King of the Monsters in 2019, originally intended to be released in 2018, and Godzilla vs. Kong in 2021, originally intended to be released in 2020. At the time, Higuchi noted that Legendary's contract was effective until 2020.

After Shin Godzilla, Toho and Polygon Pictures produced a trilogy of anime Godzilla films: Godzilla: Planet of the Monsters (2017), Godzilla: City on the Edge of Battle (2018), and Godzilla: The Planet Eater (2018). In May 2018, Toho announced that it would not make a sequel to Shin Godzilla, but would instead establish a shared universe model similar to the Marvel Cinematic Universe.

In 2022, Hideaki Anno revealed that he had planned to create a sequel to the film, stating that "I wrote a proposal during the filming of Shin Godzilla on February 3, 2016, labeled Sequel Shin Godzilla Memo. Since it was concocted to be released in 2018, the shortest time possible for a domestic-made Godzilla film to be released, it was a rough draft for people who wouldn't like Shin Godzilla, an idea that wouldn't cost too much or take too long to create. I believed that it would be a bad idea to let it go to waste so I gave the proposal, draft, and visuals, as a gift to Mr. Higuchi and Toho, but since it was premature or whatever, among other reasons, after the film's release the discussion ended. While I did feel it was a waste, it's not something I could help since Toho decides what gets made."

Collaborative projects
In 2016, Toho and Khara, Inc. collaborated on Godzilla vs. Evangelion, a cross-over line of merchandise uniting Shin Godzilla and Anno's Neon Genesis Evangelion. In May 2019, Universal Studios Japan opened the Godzilla vs. Evangelion: The Real 4D attraction. It ran until August 2019. In February 2022, Toho, Khara, Toei Company, and Tsuburaya Productions announced a collaborative project titled Shin Japan Heroes Universe for merchandise, special events and tie-ins. The project unites films that Anno had worked on that bear the katakana title "Shin" (シン・), such as Shin Godzilla, Evangelion: 3.0+1.0 Thrice Upon a Time, Shin Ultraman and Shin Kamen Rider.

Public attractions 
In 2017, Universal Studios Japan featured a temporary 4D Shin Godzilla attraction as part of its Universal Cool Japan 2017 program. In 2018, a statue of the film's version of Godzilla was erected in central Tokyo. The area was dubbed Hibiya Godzilla Square and is considered to be largest Godzilla statue in Japan, according to Toho. In October 2020, Nijigen no Mori opened a Shin Godzilla zip line attraction in Kobe, Japan.

See also

 2016 in science fiction
 Shin Ultraman (2022)
 Shin Kamen Rider (2023)

Notes

References

External links

  
 Shin Godzilla at the official Godzilla website by Toho Co., Ltd.
 
 
 
 

2016 films
2010s disaster films
2010s science fiction films
2010s political films
2010s monster movies
4DX films
Apocalyptic films
Films about nuclear war and weapons
Films directed by Hideaki Anno
Films directed by Shinji Higuchi
Films with screenplays by Hideaki Anno
Films produced by Kazutoshi Wadakura
Films scored by Shirō Sagisu
Films set in Chiba Prefecture
Films set in Germany
Films set in Tokyo
Films set in Yokohama
Films shot in Tokyo
Funimation
2010s German-language films
Giant monster films
Godzilla films
IMAX films
Japan Self-Defense Forces in fiction
2010s Japanese-language films
Japanese disaster films
Japanese drama films
Japanese political films
Japanese science fiction films
Kaiju films
Military of the United States in fiction
Films using motion capture
Reboot films
Toho films
2016 drama films
2010s English-language films
2010s Japanese films